Hexenwind is the fourth studio album by the Austrian black metal band Dornenreich. This album is available in a jewel case, and as a digipak with silver text on the cover. An additional hour of music was recorded during the sessions for this album. The music was added on their next album, Durch Den Traum.

Track listing

 "Von Der Quelle" – 2:11
 "Der Hexe Flammend' Blick" – 11:38
 "Der Hexe Nächtlich' Ritt" – 11:45
 "Aus Längst Verhalltem Lied" – 4:10
 "Zu Träumen Wecke Sich, Wer Kann" – 13:13

Personnel

Eviga: voices, guitars, tambourin 
Valnes: synths, vocals
Michael Stein: session drums

External links
Hexenwind @ Encyclopaedia Metallum
Dornenreich Official Website

2005 albums
Dornenreich albums